Ložec is a small settlement on the left bank of the Kolpa River in the Municipality of Osilnica in southern Slovenia. It belongs to the traditional region of Lower Carniola and is now included in the Southeast Slovenia Statistical Region.

References

External links
Ložec on Geopedia

Populated places in the Municipality of Osilnica